John VIII may refer to:
 Pope John VIII, Pope from 872 to 882
 Antipope John VIII, antipope in 844
 John VIII bar Abdoun, Syriac Orthodox Patriarch of Antioch (944-1033)
 John VIII of Constantinople, Patriarch of Constantinople (1010-1075)
 John VIII Palaiologos, Byzantine Emperor (1392–1448)
 John VIII, Count of Harcourt, 1398–1424
 John VIII, Count of Vendôme, 1426–1477
 John VIII, Archbishop of Antivari, d. 1571
 John VIII, Count of Nassau-Siegen, 1583–1638
 The mythical Pope Joan, in some versions of her legend

See also
 John 8, the eighth chapter of the Gospel of John

John 08